Gergely Kocsárdi (born 24 November 1975 in Zalaegerszeg) is a Hungarian football player.

In the season 2007/08, he left Zalaegerszegi TE and join the Slovenian club Nafta Lendava. However, in the second part of the season he decided to return to Zalaegerszegi TE.

Since his return, he played his first match on 29 February 2008 against Újpest FC which they won quite comfortably on the scoreline of 4-1; in front 6000 home fans.
From the second part of the season till the end of the season 2007/08, he had featured in 10 matches and he managed to play in 7 matches for a full 90 minutes.

Despite winning the Hungarian Championship in the season 2001/02, and being a member of the Zalaegerszegi TE team which shocked world football when they beat Manchester United in the first leg of the 2002–2003 UEFA Champion's League 3rd preliminary round; he has never managed in this career to win even a single cap for this country.

He was member of the Hungarian under-19 team.

Career honours
Zalaegerszegi TE
Hungarian League (1): 2002

References

External sources
 Stats from Hungarian Championship at Futball-Adattár

1975 births
Living people
People from Zalaegerszeg
Hungarian footballers
Association football defenders
Zalaegerszegi TE players
NK Nafta Lendava players
Hungarian expatriate footballers
Expatriate footballers in Slovenia
Hungarian expatriate sportspeople in Slovenia
Sportspeople from Zala County